Keith McNally (born 1951) is a British-born New York City restaurateur, the owner of several establishments including Parisian brasserie Balthazar, and formerly Nell's nightclub.

Personal life 
McNally was born into a working-class family in Bethnal Green, London. He is the son of Joyce and Jack McNally. His father Jack was an amateur boxer and docker. His brother, Brian McNally, is also a restaurateur in New York. His first wife, Lynn Wagenknecht, is also a restaurateur. One of his children (with Wagenknecht) is actress Isabelle McNally.

Career

Restaurants 
McNally has been active in the New York City restaurant scene since the 1980s. In that time, he has opened several restaurants. These include Augustine, Balthazar, Cafe Luxembourg, Cherche Midi, Lucky Strike, Minetta Tavern, Morandi, Nell's, Odeon, Pastis, Pravda, Pulino's, and Schiller's. 
Frank Bruni awarded three stars to Minetta Tavern in 2009. The New York Times has referred to him as "The Restaurateur Who Invented Downtown."

In October 2022, McNally banned, unbanned, and rebanned James Corden from entering his restaurants after Corden had behaved rudely towards a server at one of the locations after receiving an improperly prepared order. Corden later apologized to McNally and on his late night show (but not to the server), after which McNally removed the ban. McNally then reinstated the ban after Corden did a pre-planned Vanity Fair interview in which he expressed his belief that he'd done nothing wrong.

Acting 
McNally was a member of the original London cast of Alan Bennett's play Forty Years On in 1968 playing the part of Macilwaine.

Controversy 
McNally has faced controversy on Twitter and in print for his ardent support on Instagram of Woody Allen in the aftermath of the documentary series Allen v. Farrow and his equally supportive posts about Ghislaine Maxwell.

References

English restaurateurs
Businesspeople from New York City
James Beard Foundation Award winners
American restaurateurs
Living people
1951 births